Candolleomyces is a genus of fungi in the family Psathyrellaceae.

Taxonomy 
The Candolleomyces genus was created in 2020 by the German mycologists Dieter Wächter & Andreas Melzer when the Psathyrellaceae family was subdivided based on phylogenetic analysis. Many members of the Psathyrella genus were reclassified as Candolleomyces.

The type species, Candolleomyces candolleanus was previously classified as Psathyrella candolleana.

Etymology 
The genus is named after the specific epithet of the type species.

Species 
As of October 2022, Species Fungorum accepted 25 species of Candolleomyces.

References 

Psathyrellaceae
Agaricales genera